Gaighat may refer to:

Gaighat, Nepal, headquarters of Triyuga municipality
Gaighat, Ghazipur, a village in India
Gaighat (Vidhan Sabha constituency) in the state of Bihar, India
Gaighat, Patna, a neighbourhood in Patna